Vrinda is an OpenType Font for the Bengali script that is included as part of Microsoft Windows' optional support for Indic text in Windows XP and subsequent Windows versions. It is the default font for all languages which are written in the Bengali script, including Bengali,  Assamese and Meitei in the Windows operating system. It is developed and maintained  by Microsoft Corporation.

References

Microsoft typefaces
Windows XP typefaces